A legislature broadcaster is a broadcaster, a television channel or a radio station that mainly broadcasts sound or video from the legislature and other parliamentary chambers such as parliamentary commissions in a city, state or in a country.

They can be either owned by the legislature chamber itself such as Europe by Satellite owned by the European Commission, Sansad TV, or the Knesset Channel; the country's public broadcaster like BBC Parliament, S4C2 or ABC NewsRadio; or a private company like C-SPAN or CPAC.

When the chamber is down or on holiday, either the channel goes down or other public affairs programming is broadcast.

List of legislative broadcasters

Africa

Americas

Asia & Oceania

Europe

References